Licchavi (also Lichchhavi, Lichavi) was a kingdom which existed in the Kathmandu Valley in modern-day Nepal from approximately 400 to 750 CE. The Licchavi clan originated from Vaishali, and conquered Kathmandu Valley. The Lichchhavis elected an administrator and representatives to rule them.

The ruling period of this dynasty was called the Golden Period of Nepal. A table of the evolution of certain Gupta characters used in Licchavi inscriptions prepared by Gautamavajra Vajrācārya can be found online.

Records
It is believed that a branch of the Lichhavi clan, having lost their political fortune in Vaishali (Bihar), came to Kathmandu, attacking and defeating the last Kirat King Gasti . In the Buddhist Pali canon, the Licchavi are mentioned in a number of discourses, most notably the Licchavi Sutta, the popular Ratana Sutta and the fourth chapter of the Petavatthu. The Mahayana Vimalakirti Sutra also spoke of the city of Vaishali as where the lay Licchavi bodhisattva Vimalakirti was residing.

In the 4th century CE, during the reign of the Gupta emperor Samudragupta, the "Nepalas"  are mentioned among the tribes subjugated by him:

Samudragupta was a son of the Gupta Emperor Chandragupta I and the Lichchhavi princess Kumaradevi. Gold coins bearing portraits of Chandragupta and Kumaradevi have been discovered at Mathura, Ayodhya, Lucknow, Sitapur, Tanda, Ghazipur, and Varanasi in Uttar Pradesh; Bayana in Rajasthan; and Hajipur in Bihar. The obverse of these coins depicts portraits of Chandragupta and Kumaradevi, with their names in the Gupta script. The reverse shows a goddess seated on a lion, with the legend "Li-ccha-va-yah" (𑁊, "the Lichchhavis").

It was a Rich Kingdom of the ancient world. The earliest known physical record of the kingdom is an inscription of Mānadeva, which dates from 464. It mentions three preceding rulers, suggesting that the Licchavi dynasty began in the late 4th century.

Government
The Licchavi were ruled by a Maharaja ("great king"), who was aided by a prime minister, in charge of the military and of other ministers.

Nobles, known as samanta influenced the court whilst simultaneously managing their own landholdings and militia.

At one point, between approximately 605 and 641, a prime minister called Amshuverma actually assumed the throne.

The population provided land taxes and conscript labour (vishti) to support the government. Most local administration was performed by village heads or leading families. Many king ruled but the popular one were Manadeva, Amshuverma etc.

Economy
The economy was agricultural, relying on rice and other grains as staples. Villages (grama) were grouped into dranga for administration. Lands were owned by the royal family and nobles. Trade was also very important, with many settlements.

Geography

Domain
Settlements already filled the entire valley during the Licchavi period. Further settlement was made east toward Banepa, west toward Tistung, and northwest toward present-day Gorkha.

Rulers
The following list was adapted from The Licchavi Kings, by Tamot & Alsop, and is approximate only, especially with respect to dates.

185 Jayavarmā (also Jayadeva I)
Vasurāja (also Vasudatta Varmā)
c. 400 Vṛṣadeva (also Vishvadeva)
c. 425 Shaṅkaradeva I
c. 450 Dharmadeva
464-505 Mānadeva I
505-506 Mahīdeva (few sources)
506-532 Vasantadeva
Manudeva (probable chronology)
538 Vāmanadeva (also Vardhamānadeva)
545 Rāmadeva
Amaradeva
Guṇakāmadeva
560-565 Gaṇadeva
567-c. 590 Bhaumagupta (also Bhūmigupta, probably not a king)
567-573 Gaṅgādeva
575/576 Mānadeva II (few sources)
590-604 Shivadeva I
605-621 Aṃshuvarmā
621 Udayadeva
624-625 Dhruvadeva
631-633 Bhīmārjunadeva, Jiṣṇugupta
635 Viṣṇugupta - Jiṣṇugupta
640-641 Bhīmārjunadeva / Viṣṇugupta
643-679 Narendradeva
694-705 Shivadeva II
713-733 Jayadeva II
748-749 Shaṅkaradeva II
756 Mānadeva III
826 Balirāja
847 Baladeva
877 Mānadeva IV

See also

History of Nepal
Nepal
Mahajanapadas
Vaishali (ancient city)

References

Sources

External links
 Tamot, Kashinath and Alsop, Ian. "A Kushan-period Sculpture, The Licchavi Kings", Asianart.com
  History of Nepal,  Thamel.com
  "Nepal: The Early Kingdom of the Licchavis, 400-750", Library of Congress Countryreports.org (September, 1991)
 Vajrācārya, Gautamavajra, "Recently Discovered Inscriptions of Licchavi, Nepal", Kailash - Journal of Himalayan Studies, Volume 1, Number 2, 1973. (pp. 117-134)

Licchavi kingdom
Former monarchies of Asia
States and territories established in the 5th century
States and territories disestablished in the 8th century
Dynasties of Nepal
Empires and kingdoms of Nepal
8th-century disestablishments in Nepal
4th-century establishments in Nepal